Siavash Kola (also Romanized as Sīāvash Kolā) is a village in Chahardangeh Rural District, Chahardangeh District, Sari County, Mazandaran Province, Iran. At the 2006 census, its population was 105, in 30 families.

References 

Populated places in Sari County